Marcelo Alejandro González Godoy (born 18 December 1963) is a Chilean journalist and sports commentator. 

He is commonly known for his play-by-play narrations in Canal del Fútbol (CDF), Canal del Deporte Olímpico (CDO) and Chilevisión (CHV); in this last one he related Chile women's national football team campaign during 2018 Copa América Femenina, where these national team achieved a historical second place after being final phase's runner-up under Brazil. He is also known for presenting Teletrece's newscast.

Biography

Childhood and adolescence: 1963–1981
The son of cab driver and community director Mario González, and school principal Gladys Godoy, Marcelo has been linked to football since his childhood. He has been strongly influenced by his grandfather Juan Guillermo Godoy, amateur footballer who was one of the first members of the Coquimbo regional team. He began his studies at School Number 5 and later attended A8 Lyceum. 

After high school, his initial goal was to study theater, but his and his family's economical complications prevented him from pursuing this option. Regarding it, he said: "When I finished my secondary education, in those years I performed the PAA —Prueba de Aptitud Académica— and I qualified to study theater in Santiago, but due to financial problems I couldn't study".  Even so, he worked to pay for an English course to support his own projects in communications. He presented proposals to different media stations until being accepted by Canal 8 UCV TV in 1981, thereby starting his career at 18.

Rise in media: 1981–2003
Once at UCV TV, he worked at the local station for La Serena (near his native Coquimbo). There, he presented a proposal to create a program on Fiestas Patrias (Homeland Holidays), which was well received by the board.

At the same time, González began a career in radio, where he worked at a regional level for almost five years, participating in programs such as Radio Agricultura and Radio Amistad. In 1991, González decided to take a new opportunity in Santiago, the capital of Chile, where his voice was already known. He broadcast the program "" (Sports Giants) alongside personalities like Wladimiro Mimica, Eduardo Bonvallet, Carlos Caszely and Héctor Vega Onesime. This platform allowed him to be discovered by football commentator, Milton Millas, with whom he became close friends during their work at Radio Nacional, about which González states:

In 1998, he left Megavisión and joined Canal 13. The same year, and with a sufficient budget from his media work, he started studying journalism at the University of Santiago de Chile, where he graduated from in 2003.

Professional career: 2003–present

CDF Era: 2003–2008
In 2008, he left CDF.

Post-CDF Era: 2018–present
In 2018, it was reported that WarnerMedia hired him to broadcast the 2018 Copa América Femenina as play-by-play commentator alongside color commentators Fernando Tapia, Javiera Naranjo and Magdalena Grant.

In 2020, González related the 2020 Women's Primera División de Chile Final between Santiago Morning and Universidad de Chile – won by Morning – that was broadcast by Televisión Nacional de Chile. There, he was accompanied by color commentators Gustavo Huerta and Yoselin Fernández.

Points of view

Coquimbo–Serena rivalry
He thinks the rivalry between fans of Deportes La Serena and Coquimbo Unido is not positive for the region.

References

External links
 LinkedIn Profile

1963 births
Chilean people
People from Coquimbo
University of Santiago, Chile alumni
Chilean association football commentators
Mega (Chile) play-by-play commentators
Canal del Fútbol play-by-play commentators
Chilevisión play-by-play commentators
Televisión Nacional de Chile play-by-play commentators
Living people